Los Machucambos was a music band formed in Paris in 1959. The two guitar players were Rafaël Gayoso (from Spain), Milton Zapata (from Peru) and the singer was Julia Cortes (from Costa Rica) . In 1960 Zapata was replaced by Romano Zanotti (pseudonym of Giuseppe Piccolo) (from Italy)
Although the group had a long list of discography their best known hit was Pepito which became the number 1 hit in 1961.

After Julia Cortes retired in 1972 they had various lead singers, like Maria Licata (1973-1980), Florence, Maria Aparecida (1976-1980), Chilean Mariana Montalvo (1980-2005) and Haileey since 2006.

Discography
Duerme Negrito  1959 
La Canción De Orfeo / Adieu Tristesse / La Bamba / Macongo 1959 
 La Bamba  1960 
Chansons populaires d'Amérique du Sud  1960 
La Petenera / Piedra Y Camino / Recuerdos De Ipacarai / Chaparralito  1960 
Pepito / Negra Maria Esther / Dimelo En Septiembre / Luna De Benidorm 1960 
La Palomita 1961
Pepito / Negra Maria Esther 1961 
 La Cucaracha / Contigo en la Distancia / Otorrino Laringólogo / La Boa  1961 
Pepito / Dimelo En Septiembre 1961 
Pepito 1961 
Otorrino Laringologo Cha Cha Cha / La Boa Cha Cha Chacca 1961 
Aquella Rosa / Otorrino Laringologo 1961 
Non Monsieur / Fabulosa  1962 
Granada 1962 
Teresita La Chunga / Chico Cha Cha Cha 1962 
Granada Cha Cha Cha / Perfidia Cha Cha Cha 1962 
Cuando Calienta El Sol 1962 
Professor Bach / El Ascensor / Mira Mirame / La Chinqua 1963 
Non Monsieur / En El Lugar Del Mundo 1963 
La Mamma / Maria Elena / America / Melinda 1963 
Ciel de Lit / La Lune (Yo Soy la Luna) / La Bamba de Colas / Otra Bamba 11/1963 Decca 460.803
Malaga / Mi Sono Innamorato Di Te  1963 
Los Machucambos  1963 
El Watusi 1963 
La Mamma / La Bamba De Colás / América / Mexicana  1964 
Mucho Machucambos 1964
Cuando calienta el sol / Esperanza / Non monsieur (No señor) / Fabulosa  1964 Decca Edge 71774
Tartamudeando / Angelito / La Pollera Colorá / Qui Quae Quo  1965 
Valsecito  1965 
Caramba! 1966
Le Canard En Fer Blanc 1967 
Che  1970 
Pepito / Cuando Calienta El Sol  1970 
La Cumbia  1971 
El Condor Pasa  1971 
A Tonga Da Mironga Do Kabulete / Tarde Em Itapoan 1973 
Balas / Abre Alas 1975 
Maria Elena (Tuyo Et Mi Corazon) 1975 
Samba Tragique  1975 
Pepito / Solamente Una Vez  1976 
Cuando Calienta El Sol / Paseando Por La Sabana 1976 
Remember / Oda Del Desterrado  1977 
Donde Volabas 1979 
La Fiesta 1983 
Cuando Calienta El Sol 1976 
Pepito / Guantanamera 1988 
A Mover La Colita / Pepito 1996 
Vacances Tabou  
La Mamma / Tuyo Es Mi Corazon 
Song Of Orpheus / Goodbye Sadness  
La Cucaracha / Otorino Laringolo  
Cuando Calienta El Sol / La Bamba  
Garota De Ipanema  
Cuando Caliente El Sol  
Chico Cha Cha Cha / Amor Amor  
Bossa Nova  
Pepito / Adios  
Cha Cha Cha  
Os Bandeirantes  
La Cucaracha / La Bamba  
Non Monsieur (The Pink Poodle)

References

Musical groups from Paris
1961 in music
Latin music groups